Axel Jonsson-Fjällby (born 10 February 1998) is a Swedish professional ice hockey forward for the Manitoba Moose in the American Hockey League (AHL) while under contract to the Winnipeg Jets of the National Hockey League (NHL). He was selected by the Washington Capitals in the fourth round, 147th overall, of the 2016 NHL Entry Draft.

Playing career
Jonsson-Fjällby made his professional debut in his native Sweden with Djurgårdens IF of the Swedish Hockey League (SHL) in the 2016–17 season.

Washington Capitals

On May 2, 2018, Jonsson-Fjällby was signed to a three-year, entry-level contract with the Washington Capitals. He was loaned back to Djurgårdens IF on November 13, 2018, after a brief period where he played with the Hershey Bears of the American Hockey League.

Loan to Västervik and brief stint in Buffalo

On 14 September 2020, Jonsson-Fjällby signed a loan agreement with Västerviks IK in Hockeyallsvenskan. He made his debut on October 2, 2020 when they beat AIK at Hovet 4–2. The next day he scored his first and second points for the club when he made two assists in a 4–3 win against Mora IK in Smidjegrav Arena.

The first goal in Västervik came on October 20, 2020 when the team once again meets Mora IK away. He scored two goals and an assist in the match that the team lost 4–3 on penalties.

On January 8, 2021, Jonsson-Fjällby left Västervik to return to Washington Capital's organization. During his time at the club, he made 25 appearances, scoring 4 goals and 11 assists. 

While attending the Capitals 2021 training camp for the upcoming  season, Jonsson-Fjällby was placed on waivers in order for re-assignment before he was claimed by the Buffalo Sabres on October 4, 2021. Due to visa complications he would ultimately be re-claimed by the Capitals off waivers one week later on October 11, 2021 and re-assigned to the Hershey Bears of the AHL.

Winnipeg Jets
Prior to the  campaign, Jonsson-Fjällby for the second consecutive season was placed on waivers following the pre-season and was claimed by the Winnipeg Jets on 11 October 2022.

Career statistics

Regular season and playoffs

International

References

External links
 

1998 births
Living people
Djurgårdens IF Hockey players
Hershey Bears players
Manitoba Moose players
Ice hockey people from Stockholm
Swedish ice hockey left wingers
Västerviks IK players
Washington Capitals draft picks
Washington Capitals players
Winnipeg Jets players